The 1952 Campeonato Paulista da Primeira Divisão, organized by the Federação Paulista de Futebol, was the 51st season of São Paulo's top professional football league. Corinthians won the title for the 14th time. Jabaquara and Radium were relegated and the top scorer was Corinthians's Baltazar with 27 goals.

Championship
The championship was disputed in a double-round robin system, with the team with the most points winning the title and the two teams with the fewest points being relegated.

Results

Top Scores

References

Campeonato Paulista seasons
Paulista